Scouting and Guiding Federation of Turkey (Türkiye İzcilik Federasyonu, TİF) is the national Scouting and Guiding federation of Turkey. It serves 33,974 Scouts (as of 2011) and 2,883 Guides (as of 2006). The federation is a member of the World Organization of the Scout Movement since 1950, and the World Association of Girl Guides and Girl Scouts since 1987.

History

The start of Scouting in Turkey is attributed to the brothers Ahmet and Abdurrahman Robenson, who were sports teachers at the Galatasaray and Kabataş high schools in Constantinople (today: Istanbul) in 1909, and to Nafi Arif Kansu and Ethem Nejat, with first units organized at Darüşşafaka, Galatasaray, and İstanbul high schools, during the late Ottoman period.

During this same period, Scouting was created independently in outlying areas of the Ottoman Empire, most notably Lebanon and Syria.

In 1915 an Austro-Hungarian Scout unit in Constantinople was founded and served up to 1918.  This unit was a member of the Österreichischer Pfadfinderbund This Scout Association supported the foundation of Scout groups in Damascus, Beirut and Aleppo.

The Scouting efforts were put to a halt during the Balkan Wars and World War I, and again gained momentum after the foundation of the Republic of Turkey in 1923, following the fall of the Ottoman Empire. In 1926, Scouting activities began to be organized nationwide in schools.

Ahmet Han, the Director of Scouting, and Muhittin Akdik, the Director of Education in İstanbul, visited France, the United Kingdom and Switzerland in 1946 to study Scouting and its administration, and returned determined to build up the movement on fundamental and modern lines. Sıtkı Sanoplu was responsible for starting the Cub Scout program in 1950. Cub packs existed in the coeducational primary schools, and were themselves coed, but boys and girls were placed in separate sixes, or dens. Practically all the Cubmasters were women.

J. S. Wilson, Director of the Boy Scouts International Bureau, began his 1952 tour of Asia visiting Cub Scout packs, Scout troops and Girl Guide companies in İstanbul and Ankara.

With the 1991 breakup of the Soviet Union, it was suggested that the Turkish Scouting and Guiding Federation should assist in the creation of Scout movements in the Turkic Central Asian republics of Kazakhstan, Kyrgyzstan, Turkmenistan and Uzbekistan, but it is uncertain if this plan ever materialized.

The current Scouting and Guiding Federation of Turkey was legally organized in 1992 as administratively bound to the General Directorate of Youth and Sport. In February 2007, the federation gained autonomous status.

Northern Cyprus Turkish Scouts
The Scouts of Northern Cyprus (Turkish: Kuzey Kıbrıs Türk İzcileri) is a Scouting federation active in the de facto independent Turkish Republic of Northern Cyprus, and has strong ties to the Scouting and Guiding Federation of Turkey.

Program
There is an annual week called "The Scout - The Helper", which gives all members of the Scouting and Guiding Federation an opportunity to participate in community service projects, where they help for a week in hospitals, at the Red Crescent association, and in similar organizations. Scouts plant trees in villages in cooperation with the Ministry of Agriculture.

In Turkey, the Battle Hymn of the Republic is sung as a Scout camp song with Turkish lyrics, by both Boy Scouts and Girl Guides.

Program sections
 Cub Scouts - ages 7 to 11
 Scouts - ages 11 to 15
 Venture Scout- ages 15 to 18

Only the Cub packs are open to boys and girls, the older sections operate in single-gender groups.

Scout Motto
The Scout Motto is Daima Hazır, Always Prepared in Turkish.

Scout Oath
Turkish: Tanrıya, vatanıma karşı görevlerimi yerine getireceğime, izcilik türesine uyacağıma; Başkalarına her zaman yardımda bulunacağıma; Kendimi bedence sağlam, fikirce uyanık, ve ahlakça dürüst tutmak için elimden geleni yapacağıma; Şerefim üzerine söz veririm.

Translation: On my honour, I promise to do my duty to God and my country, to obey the Scouting Laws, to help other people at all times, to be physically strong, mentally awake and morally strong.

Emblem
The membership badge of the Scouting and Guiding Federation of Turkey incorporates elements of the coat of arms as well as the flag of Turkey. The trefoil represents the Girl Guides and the fleur-de-lis the Boy Scouts.

Uniform

References

Scouting 'Round the World, John S. Wilson, first edition, Blandford Press 1959.

External links
Official website 

World Association of Girl Guides and Girl Scouts member organizations
World Organization of the Scout Movement member organizations
Scouting and Guiding in Turkey
Youth organizations established in 1909
Organizations based in Ankara
Child-related organizations in Turkey
Sports governing bodies in Turkey
Youth organizations established in 1992
1992 establishments in Turkey
1909 establishments in the Ottoman Empire